Tomasz Lubaszka (born May 4, 1961 in Lubliniec) is a Polish painter.

Biography 
Lubaszka graduated from high school in Lubliniec where he attended a class with extended curriculum in humanities. From 1980 to 1984 Lubaszka was studying in Jan Długosz University in Częstochowa at the Artistic Education Institute.

The defense of Lubaszka's diploma in painting took place in professor Wincent Maszkowski's studio in 1985. During the period from 1984 to 1986 he worked at his alma mater as an intern-assistant.

Awards and distinctions 
 1986 All-Polish Painting Exhibition "Bielska Jesień 1986" – Bielsko-Biała - award
 1987 All-Polish Painting Exhibition "Bielska Jesień 1987" – Bielsko-Biała - award
 1988 National Jan Spychalski Painting Competition for painting - Poznań - award
 1989 National Zygmunt R. Pomorski Painting Competition – Katowice - award
 1990 Fine Arts Integrations, BWA - Częstochowa - award
 1994 II Fine Art Triennale "Sacrum" - Częstochowa - distinction
 1994 All-Polish Exhibition "Music in Painting" - Tychy - award
 1997 II Autumn Fine Art Salon - Ostrowiec Świętokrzyski – distinction

Individual exhibitions 
 1986 "Wieża Ciśnień" Gallery - Kalisz
 1989 "A.M." Gallery - Düsseldorf (Germany)
 1990 "Catarina" Art Gallery - Malmö (Sweden)
 1990 Modern Art Gallery. A. Patrzyk - Częstochowa
 1992 "Wzgórze" Gallery - Bielsko-Biała
 1992 BWA - Częstochowa
 1992 Gallery "Bon Art" - Częstochowa
 1992 Modern Art Gallery - Opole
 1992 Yandergeeten Art Gallery - Antwerp (Belgium)
 1994 "Gojowy" Gallery - Krefeld (Germany)
 1994 "Ipomal" Gallery - Landgraf (Holland)
 1994 "Klostermuehle" Gallery - Hude, Brema (Germany)
 1994 I.G. Gallery - Vechta (Germany)
 1994 Kardinal von Galen Haus - Cloppenburd (Niemcy)
 1996 "Club des Cards" - Lyon (France), shared exhibition with Grażyna Lubaszka and Tomasz Sętowski
 1996 Częstochowa Municipal Art Gallery
 1996 Kromeriz Municipal Museum - Kromeriz (the Czech Republic), Jerzy Fober's exhibition of painting and sculpture
 1997 "ABC Gallery", Poznań
 1997 "Gallery 9" - Prague (the Czech Republic), shared exhibition with Anna Stawiarska and Edmund Muc's sculptural art
 1998 "Sielska Gallery" - Strasbourg (France)
 1998 BWA - Zakopane, "Dialogue" exhibition
 1998 "Uniwersytecka" Gallery - Cieszyn, "Trzy Marie" exhibition - Jerzy Fober's sculpture
 1999 "ABC Gallery", Poznań, "Trzy Marie" exhibition - Jerzego Fober's sculpture, as well as Ireneusz Bęc and Adam Molęda's paintings
 1999 "Stawski Gallery" - Cracow
 1999 BWA - Bydgoszcz, "Dialogue" exhibition – together with Jerzy Fober's sculpture
 1999 BWA - Gorzów Wielkopolski, "Dialogue" exhibition – together with Jerzy Fober's sculpture
 1999 Dominik Roztworowski Gallery - Kraków, "Trzy Marie" exhibition - together with Jerzy Fober's sculpture, as well as Ireneusz Bęc and Adam Molęda's paintings
 1999 Galeria "Gaude Mater" - Częstochowa, "Trzy Marie" exhibition - Jerzy Fober's sculpture, as well as Ireneusz Bęc and Adam Molęda's paintings
 1999 Galeria ASP - Kraków, wystawa "Trzy Marie" - rzeźby Jerzego Fobera i malarstwo Ireneusza Bęca i Adama Molędy
 2000 "Ciasna" Gallery - Jastrzębie, "Friends" shared exhibition with Dariusz Miliński
 2000 Krystyna Kowalska Art Gallery - Wrocław, "Friends" shared exhibition with Dariusz Miliński
 2000 "Dialog” Gallery - Kostrzyn upon the Oder River
 2000 "Dialog" Gallery - Kostrzyn upon the Oder River, "Friends" shared exhibition with Dariusz Miliński
 2000 Modern Art. Gallery - Rybnik, "Friends" shared exhibition with Dariusz Miliński
 2000 Cracow Genius Loci - Prague (Czechy), shared exhibition with Jerzy Fober, Alina and Ireneusz Benc
 2000 Municipal Art Gallery - Częstochowa, "Dialogue" exhibition – together with Jerzy Fober's sculpture
 2000 Świdnik Cultural Centre. Photographic Gallery - Świdnica, "Friends" shared exhibition with Dariusz Miliński
 2001 "Anna Iglińska Gallery" - Cracow
 2001 "Dialog" Gallery - Kostrzyn upon the Oder River, together with Grażyna Lubaszka
 2001 "Obok" Gallery - Tychy, "Friends" shared exhibition with Dariusz Miliński
 2001 KVHS Gallery - Ludwigshafen (Germany), together with Grażyna Lubaszka
 2002 Puławy Art Gallery - Puławy
 2004 Bresan Gallery - Split (Croatia)
 2005 W&B Gallery - Barbara Warzeńska - Szczecin, together with Grażyna Lubaszka
 2007 "Duo L'evidence du mystere" - Galerie Republique SAG - Saint-Dizier Gallery, France
 2010 Contemporary Art Gallery - Biała Podlaska
 2010 "J" Gallery, Łódź – magical landscapes
 2013 Konduktorownia Gallery - Częstochowa

Collective exhibitions 
 1986 Polish Contemporary Painting Festival - Szczecin
 1986 Jan Spychalski Painting Competition for painting - Poznań
 1986 Painting Exhibition "Bielska Jesień" - Bielsko-Biała
 1987 Jan Spychalski Painting Competition for painting - Poznań 
 1987 R. Pomorski Painting Competition for painting - Katowice
 1987 Painting Exhibition "Bielska Jesień" - Bielsko-Biała
 1988 Polish Contemporary Painting Festival - Szczecin
 1988 Jan Spychalski Painting Competition for painting - Poznań 
 1988 Diocesan Exhibition "Family Home" - Częstochowa
 1988 Young Fine Art Exhibition "Arsenal" - Warsaw
 1989 R. Pomorski Painting Competition for painting - Katowice
 1989 Painting Exhibition. Stadtmuseum - Göttingen (Germany)
 1989 Sacral Art. Exhibition - New York (USA)
 1990 Painting Exhibition "Bielska Jesień" - Bielsko-Biała
 1990 Community Echibition "Fine Art Integrations" - Częstochowa
 1991 "12 Painters from Częstochowa" - Warsaw
 1991 1st All-Polish Fine Art Exhibition "Częstochowa '91" - Częstochowa
 1991 1st All-Polish Fine Art Exhibition "Częstochowa '91". Place – Collection of the Moment - Częstochowa
 1991 1st Fine Art Triennale "Sacrum" - Częstochowa
 1991 "Bielska Jesień" Painting Exhibition - Bielsko-Biała
 1991 Open-Air Exhibition Post Display - 17 Jurassic Open Air Location - Częstochowa
 1992 "Sacrum" - Saint Gaultier (Francja)
 1992 Fine Art Triennale Sacrum 1, Galerie D'Art Contemporian Du Bureau Des Expositions Artistiques - Częstochowa, Lyon
 1992 Open-Air Exhibition Post Display, "Art on the Border" – Kostrzyn on Oder
 1993 "Sacrum" - Sanit Gaultier (France)
 1993 „Art, the Place of Finding Oneself". SIAĆ - Cracow
 1993 "Via Crusis" - Częstochowa
 1993 Art Polonais Contemporrain - Lourdes (France)
 1993 "Candidus" Gallery - Częstochowa
 1994 "Painting and Metaphor" - Open-Air Exhibition Post Event - Górzno '93 - Toruń, Olsztyn, Bydgoszcz
 1994 "The Power of Abstraction" - "Gaude Mater" Gallery - Częstochowa
 1994 2nd Fine Art Triennale "Sacrum" - Częstochowa
 1994 All-Polish Exhibition. "Music in Painting" - Tychy
 1994 Open-Air Exhibition Post Display, "Art on the Border" – Kostrzyn upon Oder
 1995 "Painting and Metaphor" - Open-Air Exhibition Post Event - Górzno '94 - Toruń, Włocławek, Starogard Gdański
 1995 “The 50th Anniversary of ZPAP in Częstochowa” Exhibition - BWA - Częstochowa
 1995 Painting Exhibition - "Art & Business" Gallery - Poznań
 1995 "North-South" Painting Exhibition - Toruń, Bydgoszcz, Olsztyn
 1995 Open-Air Exhibition Post Display, "Art on the Border" – Kostrzyn upon Oder
 1996 European Sacral Art Exhibition - Lyon (France)
 1996 "North-South" Painting Exhibition - Katowice, Tychy, Cieszyn, Bielsko-Biała
 1996 Open-Air Exhibition Post Display - "Jurassic Open Air Location '96"
 1997 Galerie des Parktheaters - Ludwigshafen (Germany)
 1997 2nd Autumn Fine Art Salon - Ostrowiec Świętokrzyski
 1997 "Bielska Jesień" Painting Exhibitiom - Bielsko-Biała
 1997 Open-Air Exhibition Post Display - "Jurassic Open Air Location '97"
 1999 AQVA FONS VITE, Painting Competition - Bydgoszcz
 1999 Open-Air Exhibition Post Display, "Art on the Border" – Kostrzyn upon Oder
 2000 DAP Gallery, "The Place on Earth", Earth 2000 - Warsaw
 2000 Open-Air Exhibition Post Display, "Art on the Border" – Kostrzyn upon Oder
 2000 Open-Air Exhibition Post Display. "Obok" Gallery - Tychy
 2001 "The Nature of Nature" – Dzwonnica Gallery - Kazimierz Dolny
 2002 4th Fine Art Festival in Canada "Main Access Gallery", ArtSpace Building - Winnipeg (Canada)
 2002 Open-Air Exhibition Post Display, "Art on the Border" – Kostrzyn upon Oder
 2003 Anna Iglińska Gallery, Compass – Exhibition within the framework of the Third Polish Arts Festival - Monitoba (Canada)
 2004 Transart - Split (Croatia)
 2005 "Gaude Mater" Gallery - "From the drawer" - Częstochowa
 2005 Open-Air Exhibition Post Display "Mexico 2004" – Brama Gallery - Gliwice
 2005 Open-Air Exhibition Post Display "Mexico 2004" - Sukiennice Gallery - Kraków
 2005 W Open-Air Exhibition Post Display, "Art on the Border" – Kostrzyn upon Oder
 2006 XVI Mikołów Impressions – MDK Gallery and the Museum of Gliwice - Mikołów, Gliwice
 2007 "Birthday Collage" - Konduktorownia - Częstochowa
 2008 "Tibet" – PrzyTyCK Gallery - Tarnowskie Góry
 2008 "Friends. Lubaszka, Miliński, Kaczmarek, Chłodziński" - KCK Kostrzyn
 2008 "Art on the Border. Kunst an der Grence" - Lebus, Germany
 2009 Namaste. India, Nepal, Tibet - Klimczyk, Lubaszka, Jędrzejak - "J" Gallery, Łódź
 2010 Open-Air Exhibition Post Display - Indie, Nepal, Tibet – Contemporary Art Gallery, Sieradz
 2010 Open-Air Exhibition Post Display - Indie, Nepal, Tibet – District Museum in Kalisz
 2010 25 Mikołów Impressions – MDK Gallery Mikołów i BWA Olkusz
 2011 Galleri Weibull, Vadbeak, Denmark
 2011 Open-Air Exhibition Post Display "GAŁKOWO 2011"
 2011 Exhibition 40x40 Galleri WEIBULL Vedbaek Dania"
 2011 Open-Air Exhibition Post Display - "Szczecin Among Us" - Kapitańska Gallery and Opengallery
 2011 "AKWE" Exhibition "Malerei ohne Grenzen" – Köln, Niemcy
 2012 Open-Air Exhibition Post Display - "Szczecin Among Us" - The Ducal Castle in Szczecin
 2013 Open-Air Exhibition Post Display "Dadaj"
 2013 Open-Air Exhibition Post Display "Bory Tucholskie" Bydgoszcz and the Sejm of the Republic of Poland – Warsaw

Bibliography 
 Stanisław Gieżyński, Spotkanie z tajemnicą, Czasopismo "Weranda"
 Zdzisław Garczarek, Tomasz Lubaszka Malarstwo wstęp do katalogu
 Wojciech Skrodzki, Tomasz Lubaszka wstęp do katalogu
 prof. Janusz Karbowniczek, Tomasz Lubaszka wstęp do katalogu
 Wojciech Skrodzki, Tomasz Lubaszka malarstwo, 1992
 Aleksandra Herbowska, Życie i tworczość Tomasza Lubaszki
 Sztuka miejscem odnalezienia się
 http://www.lubaszka.art.pl/tomasz.html

References

External links 
 Tomasz Lubaszka - paintings
 Official Facebook fanpage Tomasza Lubaszki

1961 births
People from Lubliniec
Polish painters
Polish male painters
Contemporary painters
Living people
Jan Długosz University alumni